Grand Prince Wolsan (Hangul: 월산대군, Hanja: 月山大君; 18 December 1454 - 21 December 1488) was a Korean Royal Prince as the oldest son of Deokjong of Joseon and Queen Sohye. His personal name was Yi Jeong (Hangul: 이정, Hanja: 李婷).

He become a Grand Prince in 1470. Even his father was honoured as King Uigyeong (의경왕) in 1470, Great King Hoegan (회간대왕) in 1475, and given temple name Deokjong (덕종), the Prince didn't succeed his father as a Crown Prince. Later, he built a villa in his hometown in Bukchon and spent his life reading books and writing poetry there.

Biography

Early life and marriage
The Prince was born on 18 December 1454 as the oldest son of Crown Prince Uigyeong and Crown Princess Han of the Cheongju Han clan, he was also the oldest grandson of King Sejo. When the Prince was young, he grew up under the love of his grandfather. In 1457, his father died suddenly, then he was raised in the court by his grandfather.

In 1460 (6th year reign of his grandfather), he was appointed as Prince Wolsan (월산군, 月山君). When his uncle, Yejong of Joseon died suddenly at the young age, his little brother was appointed as the new King for succeeded him and then, he was appointed as Grand Prince Wolsan (월산대군, 月山大君).

On 19 August 1466, when the Prince was 9 year old, he then married Lady Bak, the daughter of Bak Jung-seon (박중선) from the Suncheon Bak clan and Lady Heo (부인 허씨) of the Yangcheon Heo clan. Lady Bak was one year older than the Prince.

Later life
After his death, Seongjong firstly gave him a posthumous name as Gong-gan (공간, 恭簡) then changed into Hyo-Mun (효문, 孝文). After his death, the Prince was buried in 427, Sinwon-ri, Wondang-myeon, Goyang-gun, Gyeonggi-do (nowadays is Sinwon-dong, Deokyang-gu, Goyang-si, South Korea) alongside his wife, Grand Princess Consort Seungpyeong. His concubine, Lady Gim (부인 김씨) was also buried nearby from his. His tombstone was written by Im Sa-hong (임사홍) in 1498 (4th year reign of Yeonsangun of Joseon).

Family
Father: Deokjong of Joseon (1438 - 2 September 1457) (조선 덕종왕)
Grandfather: Sejo of Joseon (2 November 1417 - 23 September 1468) (조선 세조왕)
Grandmother: Queen Jeonghui of the Papyeong Yun clan (8 December 1418 - 6 May 1483) (정희왕후 윤씨)
Mother: Queen Sohye of the Cheongju Han clan (7 October 1437 - 11 May 1504) (소혜왕후 한씨)
Grandfather: Han Hwak, Duke Yangjeol, Internal Prince Seowon (1400 - 1456) (한확 양절공 서원부원군)
Grandmother: Internal Princess Consort Namyang of the Namyang Hong clan (남양부부인 남양 홍씨) (1403 - 1450)
Sibling(s):
Younger sister: Yi Gyeong-geun, Princess Myeongsuk (1456 - 4 October 1482) (명숙공주)
Brother-in-law: Hong Sang, Prince Consort Dangyang (1457 - 1513) (홍상 당양위)
Nephew: Hong Baek-gyeong (1471 - ?) (홍백경)
Niece-in-law: Lady Yi (이씨)
Niece-in-law: Lady Ha of the Jinju Ha clan (진주 하씨)
Younger brother: Yi Hyeol, Grand Prince Jalsan (19 August 1457 - 20 January 1494) (이혈 잘산대군)
Sister-in-law: Han Song-yi, Queen Gonghye of the Cheongju Han clan (8 November 1456 - 30 April 1474) (공혜왕후 한씨) – No issue.
Sister-in-law: Queen Jeheon of the Haman Yun clan (15 July 1455 - 29 August 1482) (제헌왕후 윤씨)
Nephew: Yi Hyo-sin (1475) (이효신)
Nephew: Yi Yung, Crown Prince Yeonsan (23 November 1476 - 20 November 1506) (이융 연산세자)
Niece-in-law: Deposed Queen Sin of the Geochang Sin clan (15 December 1476 - 16 May 1537) (폐비 신씨)
Nephew: Unnamed prince
Sister-in-law: Yun Chang-yeon, Queen Jeonghyeon of the Papyeong Yun clan (21 July 1462 - 13 September 1530) (정현왕후 윤씨)
Niece: Princess Sunsuk (1478 - 14 July 1488) (순숙공주)
Niece: Princess Sinsuk (1481 - 13 February 1486) (신숙공주)
Nephew: Yi Yeok, Grand Prince Jinseong (16 April 1488 - 29 November 1544) (이역 진성대군)
Niece-in-law: Queen Dangyeong of the Geochang Shin clan (7 February 1487 - 27 December 1557) (단경왕후 신씨) — No issue.
Niece-in-law: Yun Myeong-hye, Queen Janggyeong of the Papyeong Yun clan (10 August 1491 - 16 March 1515) (장경왕후 윤씨)
Niece-in-law: Queen Munjeong of the Papyeong Yun clan (2 December 1501 - 5 May 1565) (문정왕후 윤씨)
Niece: Unnamed princess
Niece: Unnamed princess
Consort(s) and their respective issue(s):
Grand Princess Consort Seungpyeong of the Suncheon Park clan (1455 - 20 July 1506) (승평부부인 박씨) – No issue.
Grand Princess Consort of the Wonju Kim clan (부부인 원주 김씨)
Son: Yi Yi, Prince Deokpung (20 August 1485 - 26 March 1506) (이이 덕풍군)
Daughter-in-law: Princess Consort Papyeong of the Papyeong Yun clan (? - 16 January 1536) (파평현부인 파평 윤씨)
Grandson: Yi Ju, Prince Parim (1500 - 1541) (이주 파림군)
Grandson: Yi Yu, Prince Gyerim (? - 1545) (이유 계림군)
Grandson: Yi Ri (이리)

Others

Arts
The Prince often wrote some poems such as: 
Gukjosisan (국조시산, 國朝詩刪)
Dongmunseon (동문선, 東文選)
Yeojiseungram (여지승람, 輿地勝覽)
Daedongsirim (대동시림, 大東詩林)
Pungwoljeongjip (풍월정집, 風月亭集); was published by King Seongjong to the Ming dynasty after his death
And his other poems were also introduced to Ming dynasty and some of them were added to Jeonusanyeoljo Poetry Book (전우산열조시집, 錢虞山列朝詩集) in China.

Cultural properties
The Taesil of Grand Prince Wolsan (월산대군 태실) – 291–1, Umyeon-dong, Seocho-gu, Seoul, South Korea (Seoul Metropolitan Monument No. 30).
The Military Temple of Grand Prince Wolsan (월산대군사당) – 427, Sinwon-dong, Deokyang-gu, Goyang-si, Gyeonggi-do, South Korea (Gyeonggi-do Cultural Heritage Data No. 79).
The Tomb and Sindo Monument of Grand Prince Wolsan (월산대군 묘 및 신도비) – San 16–35, Sinwon-dong, Deokyang-gu, Goyang-si, Gyeonggi-do, South Korea (Goyang City Local Historic Site No. 1).

In popular culture
Portrayed by Im-ho in the 1994 KBS2 TV series Han Myunghoi.
Portrayed by Shin Kwi-hik in the 1995 KBS2 TV Series Jang Noksu.
Portrayed by Song Ho-seop and Lee-in in the 1998 - 2000 KBS1 TV Series The King and Queen.
Portrayed by Jang Hee-woong, Ahn Hyun-joon, Wi Hun-tae and Lee Ji-oh in the 2011 - 2012 JTBC TV series Insu, The Queen Mother.

References

Cites

External links

Korean princes
1454 births
1488 deaths
House of Yi
15th-century Korean people
People from Seoul